Hicham Diddou (born 3 March 1974) is a Moroccan alpine skier. He competed in the men's slalom at the 1992 Winter Olympics.

References

1974 births
Living people
Moroccan male alpine skiers
Olympic alpine skiers of Morocco
Alpine skiers at the 1992 Winter Olympics
Place of birth missing (living people)
20th-century Moroccan people